The triathlon competition at the 2018 Central American and Caribbean Games was held in Barranquilla, Colombia from 1 to 2 August at the Playas de Puerto Velero.

Medal summary

Men's events

Women's events

Mixed events

Medal table

References

External links
2018 Central American and Caribbean Games – Triathlon

2018 Central American and Caribbean Games events
Central American and Caribbean Games
2018
Qualification tournaments for the 2019 Pan American Games